The Nichols Block (1892) is a prominent Romanesque Revival style commercial building in downtown Bangor, Maine.  Designed by local architect Wilfred E. Mansur, it is listed on the National Register of Historic Places as part of the Great Fire of 1911 Historic District.  The building is one of few in the Exchange St. district of Bangor to have escaped both the Great Fire of 1911 and the so-called urban renewal programme of the late 1960s.

 
The building was commissioned by Eugene C. Nichols (better known as E.C. Nichols) who owned one of the largest dry & fancy goods stores in 19th century Bangor.  The E.C. Nichols Co. store was on Main Street, across the Kenduskeag Stream from the site of the 1892 Nichols Block.  Nichols' new building was apparently an investment, and was initially occupied by Meyer M. Levy's Bangor Clothing Store and, on the upper stories, a "Social Hall" rented for functions.  The opening function was a dance, just before Christmas in 1892, hosted by Miss June Nichols, the owner's daughter.  Exchange St. was at that time a center of social life in Bangor, with numerous hotels and bars.  The central train station was at the end of the street.

Wilfred E. Mansur was Bangor's most prominent turn-of-the-century architect.  In 1895 he also designed E.C. Nichol's house, a wooden mansion with a prominent round tower, still standing on Union St. at the corner with High St.

References

External links 
 Google Street View

Commercial buildings on the National Register of Historic Places in Maine
Buildings and structures in Bangor, Maine
Commercial buildings completed in 1892
National Register of Historic Places in Bangor, Maine